Basilisk is a 1982 album by The Legendary Pink Dots.

Track listing
 "Stigmata Part One (Freiheit)" 4:43
 "Klazh" 1:40
 "Love Is..." 6:58
 "No Reason" 3:51
 "834" 1:11
 "Wall Purges Night (Version)" 4:15
 "Basilisk 1" 3:42
 "Methods" 2:19
 "Clean Up" 3:42
 "Basilisk 2" 26:32
 "The Ocean Cried 'Blue Murder' on A Ferry In a Storm On a Walkman" *
 "Ideal Home / The Glory, The Glory" *

(*) Tracks included on the 2002 BLRR re-release.

Personnel
Edward Ka-Spel – vocals, keyboards
Rolls Anotherone (Roland Calloway?) – bass
Barry Gray – guitars
Phil Harmonix (Phil Knight) – keyboards
Keith Thompson – drums, percussion
April Iliffe – vocals
Keith Thompson – lead vocals on "Ideal Home"
Patrick Paganini (Patrick Wright) – violin, keyboards
Sally Graves – extra effects

Notes
The initial release by Third Mind was limited to 1,000 copies. Every release has different covers.
The version of "The Glory, The Glory" on the CD is a different version than on the 80's cassette releases.
The album was re-released in 2002 on Beta-lactam Ring Records, with remastered sound courtesy of sound engineer and long-time LPD contributor Raymond Steeg.

References

1982 albums
The Legendary Pink Dots albums
Third Mind Records albums